Sebastián Eduardo Cabrera Morgado (born 16 March 1998), nicknamed Pichu, is a Chilean footballer who plays as a left back for Chilean club Palestino.

Career statistics

Notes

International

Honours

Club
Coquimbo Unido
 Primera B: 2018

References

External links
 
 

1998 births
Living people
Chilean footballers
Chile youth international footballers
Association football defenders
Coquimbo Unido footballers
Universidad de Chile footballers
Club Deportivo Palestino footballers
Chilean Primera División players
People from Coquimbo